The Farman F.1000 was a 1930s French monoplane designed by Farman to break the world altitude record.

Development

The F.1000 was a high-wing strut-braced monoplane with a large wing area. It had a conventional fixed landing gear and was powered by a 350 hp (261 kW) Farman 8Vi engine.  The aircraft first flew on 25 June 1932, piloted by Lucien Coupet.

The pilot had a restricted view on landing and take-off and the aircraft was modified with a raised seat mounted on top of the aircraft's fuselage leaving just the pilot's legs in the original cockpit. For landing the pilot opened the pressurized hatch above his head, moved the sliding rudder bar to the up position, strapped into the fuselage seat and attached a removable stick to control the aircraft.  During the rest of the flight the pilot had a pressurised cabin with just two small windows on each side.

The F.1000 only reached 5000 m (16,405 ft) during tests, so Farman redesigned the aircraft as the Farman F.1001 which had a parasol wing and an improved view for the pilot.  Powered by a Farman Wirs engine it first flew in June 1935.  On 5 August 1935 the aircraft, with pilot Marcel Cagnot, took off on what would be a fatal attempt at the world record.  The barograph recovered showed the aircraft had reached 10,000 m (32,810 ft) but a failure of one of the cupola windows had led to a rapid decompression and death of the pilot.

A more developed version appeared later as the Farman F.1002, although it made several flights over 8,000 m (26,425 ft) little is known about the aircraft.

Variants

F.1000
Original  Farman 8Vi powered aircraft, one built. 
F.1001
Improved version, powered by a  Farman 12 Wiars, one built. First flown in May 1935, on 4 August 1935, the bursting of a window at  led to the death of the pilot.
F.1002
Further improved variant, powered by a  Farman 12 Wiars, first flown in July 1936.

Specifications (F.1000)

Notes

Bibliography

External links

The Farman Stratosphere Monoplane
A Two-Stage Supercharger

1930s French experimental aircraft
F.1000